Maxim C-J. Cheeran is an American Associate Professor of virology and  neurovirology at the University of Minnesota's Department of Veterinary Population Medicine. He trained as a veterinarian in India before earning a doctorate at the University of Minnesota, and specializes in infections of the central neural system.

References

External links

American virologists
Living people
20th-century births
University of Minnesota faculty
Year of birth missing (living people)